Nisar Muhammad is a Pakistani politician who has been a member of Senate of Pakistan, since March 2012.

Education
He holds the degree of Master of Arts which he received from the University of Peshawar in 1988.

Political career
He was elected to the Senate of Pakistan as a candidate of Pakistan Muslim League (N) in 2012 Pakistani Senate election.

References

Living people
Pakistani senators (14th Parliament)
Pakistan Muslim League (N) politicians
Year of birth missing (living people)